is an erotic comedy anime series which parodies the magical girl genre, particularly Sailor Moon and Cutie Honey. A 24-minute OVA was released in 2003 followed by a six-episode TV series, broadcast in Japan in 2006. A DVD collection containing the OVA and TV series was released in North Americain 2010.

2003 OVA Lingerie Soldier Papillon Rose

Episode list

OVA opening and closing animation, incidental music
Although the opening and closing animation shows all the Papillon characters as well as Rama and Dandy Lion, Papillon Rose is the only Papillon to appear in the episode in costume. Anne appears only in her regular form. The character Shizuku (Papillon Margarette) does not appear at all. "Papillon Violet" also only appears in the final image of the opening animation with the Papillon team. The ending animation again shows the four women characters from the TV series in one scene but then only three in the ending scene.

Incidental and background music for the OVA episode is provided by KURi-ZiLL.

2006 TV series Papillon Rose: The New Season

Plot Summary
Due to the previous events of the Papillon Wars in Kabukicho, the manager left the devastated area and moved in Akiba to open the maid cafe "New Papillon". Tsubomi is hired as a waitress, Shizuku attempts to pass the college entrance exams one more time and Anne simply passes her days sleeping with many random men. Tsubomi is approached by Rama, the cat, who, at first, she does not understand. But the Earth, specifically the Tokyo otaku district of Akiba, is under attack by a trio of powerful alien women along with their minions. The explosions around her restore her memories and she reassembles the rest of the Papillon team to defend the town. The Papillon team is reassembled and the enemies are won over by the team's magical-girl powers and their "charms".

Episode list

The runtime for the TV episodes is approximately 24 minutes.

TV series opening and closing animation, incidental music
The opening and closing animation for the TV series is changed from the OVA. The opening animation features Tsubomi and the others working at the cafe as well as them transitioning to and performing in their Papillon forms. The ending animation is a still picture with painting over the figures of the Dark sisters in repose. The three are also shown as stop-action cartoon figures in at the sides of the frame. Also included in the animation are three live female cosplay characters in Papillon costumes posing stop-action in the lower right corner of the frame.

Incidental and background music for the TV series is provided by Masaya Koike (4-Ever).

Opening and ending animation music
The OVA and TV series use the same music for the opening and ending animation and credits in the North American releases. The TV series used different music for the TV series in Japan but was changed for the North American releases for copyright reasons. 
 Opening Theme "Rosetta" with vocals by Yuki Masuda.
 Ending Theme "Memories" with vocals by Asae Sakuraga
 New Season Opening Theme "Hikari No Kizuna" with vocals by Kaoru Kido.
 New Season Ending Theme "SUSANNO san shimai ai no TEEMA" with vocals by Chiharu Minami, Hiromi Tsunakake and Umeka Shouji

See also
List of Papillon Rose characters

References

External links
 
 

Papillon Rose